The Bath bun is a sweet roll made from a milk-based yeast dough with crushed sugar sprinkled on top after baking. Variations in ingredients include enclosing a lump of sugar in the bun or adding candied fruit peel, currants, raisins or sultanas.

The change from a light, shaped bun to a heavier, often fruited or highly sugared irregular one may date from the Great Exhibition of 1851 when almost a million were produced and consumed in five and a half months (the "London Bath bun").

References to Bath buns date from 1763, and Jane Austen wrote in a letter of "disordering my stomach with Bath Bunns" in 1801. The original 18th-century recipe used a brioche or rich egg and butter dough which was then covered with caraway seeds coated in several layers of sugar, similar to French dragée.

The bun's creation is attributed to William Oliver in the 18th century. Oliver also created the Bath Oliver dry biscuit after the bun proved too fattening for his rheumatic patients. The bun may also have descended from the 18th-century "Bath cake". The buns are still produced in the Bath area of England.

Although this is disputed, the 18th-century '"Bath cake" may also have been the forerunner of the Sally Lunn bun, which also originates from Bath.

See also
 Fruit bun
 Hot cross bun
 Manchet
 Sally Lunn bun
 List of British breads
 List of buns
 Semla

References

External links
Traditional Bath bun recipe 
Bath bun with fruit
Bath bun containing sugar cube
Dr. Oliver

Somerset cuisine
1763 introductions
British breads
Yeast breads
Sweet breads
Culture in Bath, Somerset
History of Bath, Somerset
Buns